This is a list of All-American Girls Professional Baseball League pitchers who posted the best records in the history of the circuit.

All time records
Minimum of 1.000 innings of work.Bold denotes category leader''.

Single season records

Perfect games

No-hitters

Sources
 All-American Girls Professional Baseball League Record Book – W. C. Madden. Publisher: McFarland & Company, 2000. Format: Softcover, 294pp. Language: English.

See also
All-American Girls Professional Baseball League batting records
All-American Girls Professional Baseball League fielding records

 
Baseball records